Alumni Field may refer to:

Alumni Field (Kentucky State), in Frankfort, Kentucky
Alumni Field (Keene), New Hampshire
Alumni Field (Southeastern Louisiana University)
Alumni Memorial Field, the football field at the Virginia Military Institute
Alumni Field (Amherst, Massachusetts), a former sports location
Alumni Field (Boston College), the home to Boston College football before the Alumni Stadium
Stoklosa Alumni Field, Lowell, Massachusetts
Alumni Field (Wright State), in Dayton, Ohio
Alumni Field (York University), in Toronto, Ontario
The Baseball Factory Field at UMBC, formerly known as Alumni Field
Alfond Stadium (University of Maine), formerly known as Alumni Field
University of Windsor Stadium, also known as Alumni Field, Windsor, Ontario

See also
Alumni Stadium (disambiguation)